The Cliffs Hotel is in the seaside resort of Blackpool, Lancashire, It is located on the Queen's Promenade in the North Shore area of the town. The hotel was built in 1921. It is in the Baroque style and constructed of red brick and yellow terracotta. The gables have horizontal stripes. The Cliffs is owned by Choice Hotels Ltd and has 160 bedrooms.

History
Architect Halstead Best enlarged the building 1936–37 and added an underground carpark, by which time the hotel encompassed the entire block between King Edward Avenue and Empress Drive. In 1959, it had 240 bedrooms, though this had reduced to 165 by 1971.

References
Citations

Sources

 

Hotels in Blackpool
Hotels established in 1921
Hotel buildings completed in 1921
Hotels in Lancashire